Asrael is a leggenda or opera in four acts by composer Alberto Franchetti and librettist Ferdinando Fontana. The plot, based on German fairy tale and folklore, displays the conflict between the spirit of evil and the spirit of Christian love, represented by Asrael and Nefta respectively. The work is Franchetti's first opera and displays strong influences of Meyerbeer and Wagner, mixed with late 19th-century Italian idioms. The opera premiered at the Teatro Municipale di Reggio on 11 February 1888. The opera made its United States debut at the Metropolitan Opera on 26 November 1890 with Andreas Dippel in the title role.

Roles

References

External links

Operas by Alberto Franchetti
Italian-language operas
1888 operas
Operas based on fairy tales
Operas